Anna Luisa Pignatelli (born 22 November 1952, Asciano, Siena) is an Italian novelist and of aristocrat German ancestry.

Biography 
Anna Luisa Ermanna Pia Cecilia was born in Tuscany as the only daughter of Prince Wolf Georg Alfred of Schönburg-Waldenburg (1902-1983) and Countess Luciana Bargagli-Stoffi (1921-1984). She studied in Siena and graduated in Florence in Political Science. Married to a diplomat, Don Fabrizio Pignatelli della Leonessa dei Principi di Monteroduni (b. 1952), she has lived many years abroad, particular in South Korea, Tanzania, Portugal and for long periods in Guatemala where she played a significant role in the cultural life of the Italian community, has contributed with several articles to the local newspaper La Gazzetta and has organized cultural activities as honorary president of the Asociación de Damas Italianas.

Writings  
In 1989 she started her writing production with a book dedicated to Guatemalan ethnic groups of Mayan descent, showing a strong interest in the culture of the local communities. Her Tuscan roots emerge in the following novels L’ultimo feudo (2002), Buio (2006), Nero Toscano (2012) and Ruggine (2016), Foschia (2019), where the dominant themes are the attachment to the land and the ancestral values of her characters. The political and social situation of Guatemala is the main theme in the novel Le lac indigène (2012).

Her books are used in Italian literature and language courses at the Franklin & Marshall College of Lancaster (USA).

Criticism 
Antonio Tabucchi has judged her voice as unusual, lyrical, sharp, and desolate in the contemporary Italian literature, Rodolfo Tommasi has defined L’ultimo feudo as a masterpiece in contemporary fiction. About Nero Toscano (Noir Toscan) Elias Khoury wrote "It is a very beautiful book, a book of tenderness, written in a new perspective, in a language both dense and gentle. It establishes a magical relation with nature. This kind of relationship has always been essential in literature all over the world". Filippo La Porta ranked second her work Ruggine in the 2016 book list  and in Il Sole 24 ore he writes that "the art of being far from one's own time is what makes a text close to being a classic. This is the case of Ruggine". On Nero Toscano, Vincenzo Consolo writes: "This story of a southern farmer who settled in the tuscan countryside and fights alone for the preservation of nature, is an example of what everyone should do in defence of the environment and of the values we should all fight for". The french edition of the same novel, Noir Toscan, was presented by Vasco Graça Moura at the Foundation Gulbenkian in Paris in 2011. Her novels have been reviewed in numerous Italian and French newspapers and magazines: La Stampa, 23 Jan. 2016, Il Sole 24 ore, 7 Febbr. 2016, Corriere della Sera, 31 Jan. 2016, La Quinzaine littéraire, Oct. 2009, Le Monde, 31 Oct. 2009, Le Figaro littéraire, 19 Nov. 2009, Les Temps, 9 Dec. 2009, LaLibre.be, 4 Jan.2010, El Periodico, 19 Dec. 2014, Jornal de Letras, Artes e Ideias, 6 Apr. 2014, la Repubblica, 3 March 2019.

Translations 
Pignatelli is well known in France where La Differénce in 2009 published two of her books: Le dernier fief and Noir Toscan and made a new edition of Les grands enfants, already published in 2001 by Harmattan. Also in 2009 she was finalised for the section Foreign books of the Femina Prize with her novel Noir Toscan  and in 2010 she won the Prix des lecteurs du Var with the same novel. In Guatemala, El lago indigena came out in Spanish in 2016, originally published in 2012 in France by La Différence, a novel in which, through the story of a photographer, the writer denounces the massacres of civilians and indigenous communities committed by the Guatemalan army in the eighties of the last century.

Awards 

 Prize Città di Lugnano for Ruggine in 2016
 Prix des lecteurs du Var for Noir Toscan, in 2011
 Prize Fiorino d'argento for L'ultimo feudo in 2001

Works 

Maya. Vita d'oggi degli uomini di mais, Firenze: Nardini press, 1989, . 1. rist. 1991, 2.rist. 1996
Gli impreparati, Paisan di Prato, Campanotto, 1996., 
French translation  Les grands enfants 1°. ed Paris ; Budapest ; Torino : l'Harmattan, 2001,, 2°. ed. Paris : la Différence, 2009, 
L'ultimo feudo, Faenza: MobyDick, 2002, ., 
French translation Le dernier fief with the publisher La Différence, 2009 .
Buio, Bologna: Pendragron, 2006,  
French translation Noir toscan, La Difference, 2009, 
Nero toscano, Lantana, 2012, . 
Le lac indigène, withafterword  by Dante Liano, Paris: La Différence, 2012, . Spanish ed., Guatemala Sophos, 2016, 
Ruggine, Roma: Fazi, 2016, 
 Foschia, Roma, Fazi, 2019, .
 Il campo di Gosto, Roma, Fazzi, 2023, 
<div>

References

Bibliography
 

Writers from Siena
1952 births
21st-century Italian women writers
20th-century Italian women writers
Living people
University of Florence alumni